Amar Hodžić (born 22 September 1989), known by his stage name Buba Corelli, is a Bosnian rapper and hip-hop recording artist, songwriter, record producer and entrepreneur. He is best known for his collaborative efforts with Jala Brat, with whom he also founded their record label Imperia.

Outside of his own musical career, Buba Corelli has also attained significant success as a producer working for well known regional artists such as Maya Berović, Milan Stanković and Severina.

Life and career

1989–2014: Early life and career beginnings
Amar Hodžić was born on 22 September 1989 in Sarajevo, SR Bosnia and Herzegovina, SFR Yugoslavia. According to Hodžić, he initially showed interest for music as a teenager, but released his first song in 2004 alongside his childhood friend as the Corelli duo. In 2009, he became a member of the Sarajevo underground hip hop group called G-Recordz and started using his stage name.

Soon Hodžić was introduced to Jasmin Fazlić, known as Jala Brat, with whom he started collaborating on their EP titled Sin City, which was released in March 2013. Their collaborative studio album Pakt s Đavolom (Deal with the Devil) was then released in December the following year.

2015–present: Mainstream success and legal issues
In June 2015, Hodžić was arrested under suspicion of drug dealing and spent time in detention until May 2016. However, in December, previously recorded single, titled "Habibi", by Serbian artist Rasta was released featuring Corelli. The song went viral, counting more than forty million views on YouTube, and rose to become Corelli's first mainstream success. In June 2016, Hodžić was hit on the back of the head with a glass bottle while performing in a Doboj nightclub. Three individuals were arrested following the incident. His collaborative album Kruna (Crown) with Jala Brat, released in November under their own label Imperia, also saw great success bringing them to the regional limelight.

In February 2017, Jala Brat and Buba Corelli worked alongside Serbian singer Milan Stanković on his single "Ego". In June, Corelli scored another hit with "Opasno" (Dangerously). The following month, Bosnian pop-folk singer Maya Berović successfully released her sixth studio album, Viktorijina tajna, entirely produced by Jala Brat and Buba Corelli. At the end of July, the duo also released their own single "Ultimatum". In December, they collaborated with Austrian rapper RAF Camora on "Nema bolje" (There Is No Better).

In April 2018, they released a promotional single, called "Mafia". Then in May, Hodžić released his solo single "Balenciaga" and in June yet another collaborative single, titled "Ona'e" (She's), this time with Serbian artist Coby. These songs were a part of the campaign for their first concert in Belgrade, held on June 23, at Tašmajdan stadium in front of 15,000 people. They also performed at Skenderija in Sarajevo on 9 August and in the Belgrade Arena with Serbian pop-folk Aca Lukas on the New Year's eve.

In 2018, they worked again with Maya Berović, this time on her seventh album, released in July. Then in December, they released a single, "Benga po snijegu" (Beemer In The Snow), featuring Rasta. The duo released three more singles so far this year, "Mila" (Dear), "Bebi" (Baby) and "Kamikaza" (Kamikaze), latter featuring Slovenian singer Senidah, in January, April and August, respectively. Buba Coreli was also featured in two tracks from Jalas solo album 99 from September. However, in the same month, Hodžić was sentenced to one year in prison for illegal drug production and trafficking.

Discography

Studio albums
Pakt s Đavolom, with Jala Brat (2014)
Stari Radio, with Jala Brat (2016)
Kruna, with Jala Brat (2016)
Alfa & Omega, with Jala Brat (2019)

Extended plays
Sin City, with Jala Brat (2013)

Awards and nominations
Music Awards Ceremony

!
|-
| rowspan="3"|2019
| 'Ego'  Milan Stanković ft. Jala Brat & Buba Corelli
| rowspan="2"| Collaboration of the Year
| 
| rowspan="3"|
|-
| 'Pravo vreme'  Maya Berović ft. Buba Corelli
| 
|-
| 'Balenciaga'
| Modern Dance Song of the Year 
| 
|}

References

External links

1989 births
Living people
Singers from Sarajevo
Bosnia and Herzegovina musicians
Bosnia and Herzegovina rappers
Bosniaks of Bosnia and Herzegovina